Uncle Nearest Premium Whiskey is a brand of Tennessee whiskey produced by Uncle Nearest, Inc., headquartered in Shelbyville, Tennessee. The whiskey is named after the formerly enslaved man, Nathan "Nearest" Green, who taught a young Jack Daniel the craft of distilling.

As of 2020, seven brand variants have been produced: Uncle Nearest 1856 Premium Aged Whiskey, Uncle Nearest 1856 Premium Silver Whiskey, Uncle Nearest 1820 Premium Aged Whiskey (Nearest Green Single Barrel Edition), Nathan Green 1870 Single Barrel (UK), Uncle Nearest 1884 Small Batch Tennessee Whiskey, Master Blend, and Uncut/Unfiltered Straight Rye Whiskey. According to the IWSR, Uncle Nearest is the fastest-growing whiskey brand in the United States.

Uncle Nearest was named one of the 100 Reasons to Love America by People magazine in 2021,and one of Inc.'s 5000 fastest-growing US companies in 2022.

History 
Uncle Nearest, Inc., launched the Uncle Nearest Premium Whiskey brand in July 2017 and subsequently announced plans to expand into domestic and international markets. It is the first spirit named after an African-American. As of September 2019, it is sold in all 50 states and twelve countries.

The company's first 11-year-old, single-barrel whiskey premiered in October 2018 via the British Bourbon Society under the name Nathan Green 1870 Single Barrel.

In 2019, Uncle Nearest announced Victoria Eady Butler, a descendant of Nathan Green, as master blender, becoming the first known African-American female whiskey master blender. She was named Master Blender of the Year by Whisky Magazine, VinePair, and The Spirits Business in 2021.

In June 2020, the Nearest Green Distillery and the Jack Daniel Distillery announced the Nearest & Jack Advancement Initiative. Each company contributed $2.5 million to create the Nearest Green School of Distilling at Motlow State Community College, which includes the Leadership Acceleration Program for apprenticeships, and the Business Incubation Program, which provides expertise and resources to African-Americans entering the spirits industry.

On June 1, 2021, Uncle Nearest formed the Uncle Nearest Venture Fund, a $50 million initiative to invest in minority-founded and owned spirits brands. The company announced the Old Fashioned Challenge in January 2023 to raise $1 million for HBCU's.

Nathan "Nearest" Green 
Known as Uncle Nearest, Nathan "Nearest" Green has been acknowledged since 2016 as the first African-American master distiller on record in the United States. He taught Jack Daniel to make Tennessee whiskey and served as the first master distiller – formerly called "head stiller" – for the Jack Daniel Distillery as a free man after the Civil War. He was instrumental in developing the Lincoln County Process, the sugar maple charcoal filtering method used to make most Tennessee Whiskey.

Nearest Green Distillery 
In 2017, a rezoning proposal was approved by the Bedford County board to accommodate a whiskey-themed business at the former Sand Creek Farms in Shelbyville, Tennessee. On September 14, 2019, the first phase of the Nearest Green Distillery opened, which included the Welcome House, a bottling house, a working horse and cattle farm, and the Toppy's Copper Skies Bar. It was the first distillery in the United States named after a Black person.

After a year-long closure due to the COVID-19 pandemic, the distillery re-opened its doors on Juneteenth 2021, debuting its second phase, which added a single-barrel rickhouse, an improved Welcome House and Family Testing Room, a restaurant, a non-alcoholic speakeasy, and the Master Blender House. That month, the distillery purchased an additional 53 acres for further expansion, and announced plans to dedicate 100 acres to grow organic corn for its blends. The distillery's second phase will complete with the future opening of the Still House and Humble Baron, an entertainment venue featuring the world's longest bar (designed by Death & Co.).

Whiskeys 

The Uncle Nearest brand originally included a silver and an aged whiskey, both distilled from locally sourced grains and bottled in Tennessee. The silver whiskey takes 25 days to make, using an 11-step process that includes a triple charcoal mellowing system designed for the brand. The company added a single-barrel whiskey in July 2018. Whiskey makers in Columbia are producing the Uncle Nearest whiskeys until renovations at the Nearest Green Distillery are complete.

The recipe behind the Uncle Nearest Tennessee whiskeys dates back to the whiskeys made in the late 1800s in Lincoln County. According to Nearest Green Foundation co-founder Fawn Weaver, "[the recipe] was saved from a fire just behind the square in Lynchburg, and is now under lock and key at the Farmers Bank in Lynchburg, the bank Jack Daniel founded in 1888." The recipe includes corn malt, a former whiskey ingredient long missing from Tennessee whiskeys.

The brand's first three releases are named after the year Nearest was born (1820), the year he was credited with perfecting the Lincoln County Process (1856), and the year he retired (1884).

In September 2022, Uncle Nearest released its first rye whiskey, Uncle Nearest Uncut/Unfiltered Straight Rye Whiskey.

Awards and ratings

References

External links 
 
 Video: The lost story of the slave who taught Jack Daniel how to make whiskey (2017) from CBS This Morning on YouTube.com

Distilleries in Tennessee
Companies based in Tennessee
Companies established in 2017
Whisky distillers